Royal Air Force Upper Heyford or more simply RAF Upper Heyford is a former Royal Air Force station located  north-west of Bicester near the village of Upper Heyford, Oxfordshire, England. In the Second World War the airfield was used by RAF Bomber Command. During the Cold War, Upper Heyford was one of the former RAF bases chosen to house the United States Air Force Strategic Air Command (SAC) nuclear-capable bombers on 90-day TDY (Temporary Duty) deployments until 1959, SAC Reflex Alert deployments from 1959 until 1965, from 1966 United States Air Forces in Europe (USAFE) tactical reconnaissance aircraft, and from 1970 General Dynamics F-111 Aardvark strike aircraft.

Royal Air Force
Work on clearing the site began on 1 June 1918 when a detachment of the Canadian Forestry Corps arrived after completing similar work at RAF Hooton Park, near Ellesmere Port. The station was opened in July 1918 by the Royal Air Force.  In November the Canadian Air Force was formed at Upper Heyford, by renumbering two RAF squadrons and posting in Canadian pilots and observers, and groundcrew trained at RAF Halton. By 1920 the aerodrome had closed, and the land returned to the owners, New College, Oxford, to lease out for agricultural use. In 1923 there were concerns over the French occupation of the Rhineland after Germany had defaulted on the payment of war reparations. Upper Heyford was one of the sites chosen for a new strategic bomber force capable of attacking targets in France. Upper Heyford was intended to be the blueprint for the other bases. Land for the new airfield and technical site was purchased in 1924, and for the domestic site in 1925. Rising costs and delays mean that the first aircraft (the Oxford University Air Squadron) did not arrive until October 1927. No. 99 Squadron RAF arrived from RAF Bircham Newton in January 1928.

The rearmament of Germany in the 1930s led to a change in role for Upper Heyford, as German targets were beyond the range of RAF bombers then in service. As a result, Upper Heyford became a base to train newly formed squadrons or for squadrons re-equipping with new aircraft types. Bomber squadrons then moved to East Anglia or Lincolnshire & Yorkshire to aerodromes closer to Germany. When the Second World War broke out the two resident RAF Bristol Blenheim Squadrons deployed to France and did not return. Instead, Heyford trained bomber crews to fly, navigate and bomb at night. For this they used Handley Page Hampdens and Vickers Wellingtons, supported by Avro Ansons, switching to de Havilland Mosquitos in 1945. No. 1 Parachute Training School RAF arrived from RAF Ringway (Manchester Airport) in March 1946, expanding later to include glider training, and moving to RAF Abingdon in 1950. 
The airfield was used by many units of the Royal Air Force (RAF), mainly as a training facility between 1918 and 1950.

At the outbreak of the Second World War, RAF Upper Heyford was the home to units of RAF Bomber Command, specifically No. 18 and No. 57 (Bombing) Squadrons, forming No. 70 (Bomber) Wing of No. 2 (Bombing) Group.

The following units have also been stationed at RAF Upper Heyford at some point (note that units moved out, from March to December 1942, while new runways were laid):

Squadrons;

United States Air Force use

7509th Air Base Group
In response to what was perceived as a growing worldwide threat, Strategic Air Command decided to house a strong force of American bomber aircraft in England.  It was decided to convert four airfields in and around Oxfordshire to serve as their regular stations. Upper Heyford was one of those selected, the others being RAF Brize Norton, RAF Fairford and RAF Greenham Common.

Also new hardstands were constructed for the very heavy bombers of SAC's Intercontinental Bombing Force of Convair B-36 Peacemakers and Boeing B-50 Superfortresses. A secure weapons storage facility was also added.

On 7 July 1950, the first group of United States Air Force personnel arrived on the station. The original organization consisted of one officer and 26 airmen. It was designated as RAF Upper Heyford, and used by the 7509th Air Base Squadron.  The 7509th would act as the host organisation to support the TDY aircraft and personnel detached from their home airfields in the United States of America.

Upper Heyford was formally handed over to the United States Air Force Third Air Force on 15 May 1951.  This was formalised at a special ceremonial parade on 1 June 1951.

Visiting TDY rotational units at Upper Heyford were: 93rd Bomb Wing, 97th Air Refueling Squadron, 509th Air Refueling Squadron, 301st Bomb Wing, 8th Air Sea Rescue Squadron, 2nd Bomb Wing, 5th Bomb Wing Detachment, and the 22nd Bomb Wing.

On 25 May 1951 the 7509th Air Base Squadron was re-designated the 7509th Air Base Group.  Then on 10 January 1952, the 7509th Air Base Group at Upper Heyford became the 3918th Air Base Group.  On the same day the Third Air Force, under United States Air Force Europe, relinquished control of the station and turned it over to the Strategic Air Command.

3918th Strategic Wing 

The first SAC aircraft to be based at UH were the 15 B-50Ds of the 328th Bombardment Squadron, which arrived in December 1951, whilst the other three-squadrons of the 93rd Bombardment Wing were deployed to RAF Lakenheath.

By September 1952, Upper Heyford was ready to handle a full complement of 45 aircraft and when the 2nd Bombardment Wing arrived it deployed all three of its bombardment squadrons here with their B-50s Lakenheath.  SAC Squadrons and Wings continued to be deployed to the base throughout the 1950s and 60's.

One of the most notable events of 1954 was the arrival of the first of the truly massive Convair RB-36 Peacemakers, a small number of which flew in for a brief stay in June and July by the 5th Strategic Reconnaissance Wing.

In 1958 the unit was redesignated the 3918th Combat Support Group.

Occasional visits by the huge Boeing B-52 Stratofortress commenced at the end of 1960 and became more and more frequent over the next five years. Meanwhile, following nuclear tests behind the 'Iron Curtain' in the summer of 1962, a detachment of top secret Lockheed U-2 strategic reconnaissance aircraft operated from Upper Heyford in August to carry out air sampling and analysis at very high altitudes in order to determine the characteristics of latest Soviet weapons. A third new aircraft type, the Convair B-58 Hustler, was occasionally seen.

On 1 February 1964 the unit was redesignated the 3918th Strategic Wing.

In 1964, it was decided that regular detachments of SAC bomber aircraft to England would cease altogether, and both Fairford and Greenham Common were closed. At Upper Heyford 'Reflex Alert' continued until 1 January 1965, and the last B-47 detachment was stood down at RAF Brize Norton on 1 March 1965.

As well as the bomber force, Brize Norton had regularly hosted small and highly secret detachments of reconnaissance aircraft such as the RB-47s of the 55th Strategic Reconnaissance Wing at Forbes AFB and later at Offutt AFB.  In preparation for the transfer of Brize Norton to the RAF, these operations had to be relocated and since Upper Heyford was the only station of the four Oxfordshire bases to remain in American hands, it became the new advanced base for these special operations. A new Detachment was formed, designated as the Detachment 1, 98th Strategic Wing, supporting the Boeing RC-135 of the 55th and the 6th Strategic Wing, at Eielson AFB, Alaska and supporting Boeing KC-135A Stratotanker tankers from the 98th SW at Torrejon AB Spain. The 6985th Electronic Security Squadron, United States Air Force Security Service (USAFSS) at Eielson AFB also maintained Detachment 1, supporting Communications Intelligence Specialist flying on the RC-135's.

When the 3918th Strategic Wing was discontinued in the summer of 1965, the base was transferred to the United States Air Forces Europe and assigned to the Third Air Force and the newly organized 7514th Combat Support Group.

66th Tactical Reconnaissance Wing 

On 7 March 1966, French President Charles De Gaulle announced that France would withdraw from NATO's integrated military structure.  The United States was informed that it must remove its military forces from France by 1 April 1967.

Upper Heyford was now to serve as the new and urgently needed base for the McDonnell RF-101 Voodoos of the 66th Tactical Reconnaissance Wing which had been stationed at Laon-Couvron Air Base, France. After rapid preparations had been made, the unforeseen transfer of this unit was completed by 1 September 1966.

The 66th TRW was composed of the 17th and 18th Tactical Reconnaissance Squadrons.

During 1968 it was announced that the 66th TRW was to convert to the McDonnell Douglas RF-4C Phantom II in the following year. On 27 March 1969, the first two Phantoms flew into Upper Heyford. and the 66th became a mixed reconnaissance force.  The RF-101C's were assigned to the 18th TRS and were limited to the daylight role.  The RF-4C's were assigned to the 17th TRS and were capable of an all weather day and night operation.

The advent of the RF-4 gave the 66th TRW a longer arm in terms of target access. In the event of a 'hot' war the longer reach of the wing's aircraft would have made many previously inaccessible targets behind the iron curtain easily acquired from the bases in West Germany to which they would have been deployed.

The Phantoms did not stay for long, however, as in January 1970 the inactivation of the 66th TRW commenced, the RF-4Cs of the 17th TRS going to the 86th TFW at Zweibrücken Air Base in Germany, and the RF-101s of the 18th TRS to the 363rd TRW at Shaw Air Force Base, South Carolina.

Base Flight Section of the 66th Field Maintenance Squadron maintained Douglas C-54 Skymaster, Douglas C-47 Skytrain, Convair VT-29 Samaritan (for the Commander 322d AD), supporting Third Air Force operations and air transport requirements. The Wing also operated Detachment 1 at RAF Northolt supporting VIP operations outside of London.

Since the early 1950s, the 20th Tactical Fighter Wing had been operating from the USAF station at RAF Wethersfield, but this base had a limited potential for development and was awkwardly close to the expanding civilian airport at Stansted.  Now with more aircraft on the base than there had been for some time, it was necessary to transfer the 98th Strategic Wing detachment as well as Detachment 1, 6985th Security Squadron to RAF Mildenhall, thus bringing to an end the SAC/USAFSS presence on 31 Mar 1970.

The 66th Tactical Reconnaissance Wing at Upper Heyford was inactivated and 66th Combat Support Group and assigned squadrons (Without Personnel or Equipment) were relocated to RAF Wethersfield.

20th Tactical Fighter Wing 

Headquarters, 20th Tactical Fighter Wing relocated from RAF Wethersfield to RAF Upper Heyford on 1 June 1970.

Shortly after arriving at Upper Heyford, the 20th TFW began converting to a new aircraft - the General Dynamics F-111E Aardvark (unofficially).  On 12 September 1970 the first two F-111Es arrived at RAF Upper Heyford. The last of the 20th's North American F-100 Super Sabres that it brought from Wethersfield were transferred to the Air National Guard on 12 February 1971.  In November 1971, the wing's F-111s were declared operationally ready.

The 20th TFW participated in F-111 NATO and US unilateral operations Shabaz, Display Determination, Cold Fire, Ocean Safari, Datex, Priory, Reforger, Dawn Patrol, Highwood, Hammer, Open Gate (1982 at Ovar Air Base, Portugal) and others from January 1972 to October 1993.

Upper Heyford gained a fourth flying squadron on 1 July 1983, with the activation of the 42nd Electronic Combat Squadron. In February 1984, the first Grumman (General Dynamics) EF-111A Ravens of that squadron arrived.

Parental responsibility over the 42nd by the 20th TFW was short-lived, however, and on 1 June 1985, operational control of the squadron shifted to the 66th Electronic Combat Wing at Sembach Air Base, Germany.

Anti-nuclear protests 
In spring 1982, as tensions between the West and the USSR rose, 12 activists set a peace camp outside the air base. In May 1983 Christian CND organised Peace Pentecost attended by around 2,000 people. In June of 1983 there were larger protests culminating when 4,000 people converged as part of a campaign to prevent the expansion of the base. During a blockade, 752 people were arrested.

Operation El Dorado Canyon 
In March 1986, the 66th Electronic Combat Wing detached the 42nd ECS to the 20th TFW to take part in El Dorado Canyon, the raid on Libya.

On 14 April 1986, 5 EF-111As and 20 F-111Es took off from RAF Upper Heyford as part of the attack force. They were used as an airborne reserve for the F-111Fs of the 48th TFW, RAF Lakenheath. Three EF-111s (two were spares and turned back) formed up with the 48th's F-111Fs and provided electronic defense during the attack on Tripoli.

Operation Desert Storm 
On 25 January 1991, during the Gulf War, the wing was once again up to four flying squadrons when the 42nd Electronic Combat Squadron was reassigned to the 20th from the 66th Electronic Combat Wing.

On 17 January 1991, 20th TFW aircraft launched combat missions from both Turkey and Saudi Arabia and continued flying combat missions until the cease fire.

Crews who flew those first few terrifying nights said that the illumination from the AAA was so bright that they didn't need the TFR to avoid the ground.

During the war, the F-111Es attacked a range of targets, including power plants, petroleum refineries, airfields, nuclear-biological-chemical processing and storage facilities, and electronics sites throughout northern Iraq,

When Desert Storm ended, the wing had deployed 458 personnel, flown 1,798 combat sorties without a loss, and dropped 4,714 tons of ordnance.

Post Cold War era
With the end of the Cold War, the presence of the 20th TFW was deemed no longer necessary in the United Kingdom.  The USAF presence at RAF Upper Heyford was gradually run down (phased down).

The 20th Tactical Fighter Wing, along with the associated 55th, 77th, and 79th Tactical Fighter Squadrons were officially re-designated the 20th Fighter Wing and 55th, 77th and 79th Fighter Squadrons on 1 October 1991.

On 19 October 1993, aircraft 67-120 went to the Imperial War Museum in Duxford where it is now on display. It retains the 55th Fighter Squadron, 20th Fighter Wing markings it carried when stationed at RAF Upper Heyford.  It flew 19 Desert Storm missions and flew into Duxford on 19 October 1993.

The last of the wing's three F-111E aircraft departed from Upper Heyford on 7 December 1993. The flagship of the 55th Fighter Squadron, aircraft 68-055 Heartbreaker, departed first. It went to Robins AFB, Georgia, where it is now on display. The next aircraft, 68-061 The Last Roll of Me Dice, departed for the Aerospace Maintenance and Regeneration Center at Davis Monthan AFB Arizona, in the USA.  Finally aircraft 68-020 The Chief, flew to Hill AFB, Utah, where it is now on display at the Hill Aerospace Museum in the USA.

Closure 

On 15 December 1993 the flight line at RAF Upper Heyford was closed.  On 1 January 1994 the 20th Fighter Wing at RAF Upper Heyford was transferred without personnel or equipment to Shaw AFB, South Carolina, United States, where it inherited the personnel and General Dynamics F-16 Fighting Falcons of the inactivated 363rd Fighter Wing.

At that time RAF Upper Heyford came under the 620th US Air Base Wing until 30 September 1994, when the U.S. Air Force returned the airfield to the British Ministry of Defence.

The runways are now home to a variety of wildlife including the scarce lowland calcareous grassland and bird species such as peregrine falcon, Eurasian skylark and common buzzard.  Some of the buildings are used as an automotive storage compound for new and used vehicles. Other functions include police driving activities such as training.  There is a boat builders called Kingsground Narrowboats located at building 103, this building is the oldest on the airfield and used to be the fire department originally, outside the boat-building workshop there are still parking spaces road marked as "FD". The majority of the residential buildings are now let out as rented accommodation and some of the shops and services have been re-opened to service the community.

There are however many buildings which are still boarded up and it is currently unclear what the future of those will be.  It seems that many of the buildings such as the hospital have been targeted by vandals who have smashed glass and walls in as well as internal fittings.  Graffiti has also occurred, as well as the whole hospital suffering from damage from leaking rainwater that has subsequently caused extensive mould, damp floors and a flooded cellar. The building, however has now been secured as it is rumoured to be sold. The disused buildings have also become popular with local urban explorers.

Several of the hardened aircraft shelters were placed on the English Heritage list of scheduled monuments in 2010. A bid was made in 2011 for the site to receive World Heritage Site status but it did not make the UK shortlist.

In May 2012, the residential section was leased to First And Only Airsoft for a short period of use as an airsoft site. This lease ended in January 2013.

In March 2020, several of the hangars were converted into temporary morgues during the Covid-19 pandemic.

Dorchester Group ownership 
In 2009 Dorchester Group acquired Heyford Park from previous owners The North Oxfordshire Consortium, with plans to redevelop the former airfield into more than 1000 new homes alongside a new employment hub.

In 2013 construction work commenced for the first new homes and Heyford Park Free School opened. The school is an all-through school for children aged 3-19 and is located in the refurbished Officer’s Mess and Specialisms Campus (the former USAF gym).

In 2018 Dorchester Group submitted a new Masterplan application to Cherwell District Council to create 1600 additional homes as well as an employment hub for creative industries.

In 2019 the newly refurbished Heritage Centre was opened by Dorchester Group displaying a range of items from the site’s history and running guided tours of the airfield, including giving access into some of the historic buildings.

As of July 2020, there were c.2000 residents living at Heyford Park.

See also
 List of former Royal Air Force stations
 United States Air Forces in Europe
 United States Air Force in the United Kingdom
 Strategic Air Command in the United Kingdom

References

Citations

Bibliography

External links

 RAF Upper Heyford Memorial Website

1918 establishments in the United Kingdom
Royal Air Force stations in Oxfordshire
Installations of the United States Air Force in the United Kingdom
Military installations closed in 1994
Scheduled monuments in Oxfordshire
Royal Air Force stations of World War II in the United Kingdom